Space Research Corporation was a corporation founded by Gerald Bull, after the budget for his research at Project HARP for the United States and Canadian federal governments was cut in 1967, in order to commercialize the technology of long-range artillery. Project HARP's assets were then given to the newly formed SRC. Affiliated companies included: SRCQ (SRC Quebec); Shefford Electronics Corp (SEC of Granby, Quebec); SRCI; Paragon; PRB (Belgian corporation); and SRCB (SRC Belgium).

Background
In 1965, McGill University sponsored the Aeroballistic Laboratory (alternately the McGill Aeroballistic Test Center) at Highwater, Quebec. Dr. Gerald Bull was the Director. The manager was R.C. Stacey.

Artillery exports
During the next decade, SRC worked for a number of governments including the People's Republic of China, Chile, Taiwan, and especially South Africa, and SRC contracted with the South African company Armscor. SRC's main product was a modification of the NATO- and U.S.-standard 155.4 mm (6") artillery cannon, the GC-45 howitzer ("GC" stood for "Gun, Canada", 45 for 45-calibre long), firing either NATO-standard 155 mm M107 rounds, or, more typically, a new shell of Bull's own design.

The new "pointy" shell, designated ERFB (for extended range full bore), offered considerably better aerodynamics than the original; its spin was moderated by fins on the shell rather than only by rifling in the barrel, and the round was supported in the gun barrel by four aerodynamic nubs allowing the middle of the shell to be elongated and thus reduce drag. The shell was initially spun in the same way as conventional artillery rounds with a driving band towards the base. The result was a gun that could out-range the original by as much as 30%, while at the same time being much more accurate. With the innovative base-bleed system developed in Sweden this range could be increased to  without loss of accuracy.

South African connection
The GC-45 work was paid for by the South Africans, but it has been claimed that Bull did the work largely at the urging of the United States Central Intelligence Agency (CIA) who considered South Africa as a defence against Soviet operations in Angola. Used in South Africa as the G5 howitzer, the new guns were used near the Angolan border in 1986 when South Africa invaded the former Portuguese colony of Angola, in order to assist UNITA. Because the Marxist government of Angola was aided by Cuban troops and Soviet artillery, it was also suggested that the CIA had encouraged the South Africans to invade the country in 1975 at the beginning of the Angolan Civil War. The G5 howitzers were instrumental in securing success in Angola, although wider strategic considerations led to South Africa's eventual withdrawal.

Arms embargo
Although the 1977 United Nations mandatory arms embargo prohibited the export of arms to South Africa, Bull's SRC supplied the apartheid regime with gun barrels and 30,000 shells, worth more than $30 million. Due to the ANC support by the Soviet Union, the CIA were said to have encouraged the deal and the shipment on the MV Tugelaland was with the co-operation of Israeli Military Industries. U.S. Customs initially considered prosecuting as many as 15 people involved but decided to indict just Bull and his partner, Rogers Gregory. Bull pleaded guilty, expecting a fine, but was angered when during 1980 he was imprisoned for four months. The effect of his guilty plea meant that the court did not hear any evidence of the suspected U.S. government collusion concerning these arms exports to South Africa. As a result of the arms embargo violation, however, SRC was liquidated.

The company was subsequently re-incorporated in Brussels where Bull managed it for several years. He was murdered during 1990, it is commonly conjectured by MOSSAD.

Gun development

Footnotes

References
 Adams, James. Bull's Eye: The Assassination and Life of Supergun Inventor Gerald Bull. New York: Times Books, 1992. .
 Frontline: "Gerald Bull: The Man Who Made the Supergun"
 Grant, Dale. Wilderness of Mirrors: The Life of Gerald Bull. Scarborough, Ont.; Englewood Cliffs, N.J.: Prentice-Hall Canada, 1991. .
 Lowther, William. Arms and the Man: Dr. Gerald Bull, Iraq and the Supergun. Presidio Press, 1991. 

Defense companies of the United States
Defunct companies based in Vermont
Troy, Vermont